Otacilia is a genus of araneomorph spiders in the family Phrurolithidae, first described by Tamerlan Thorell in 1897.

Species
 it contains 123 species:

Otacilia acerosa Yao, Irfan & Peng, 2019 — China
Otacilia acuta Fu, Zhang & Zhang, 2016 — China
Otacilia acutangula Liu, 2020 — China
Otacilia ailan Liu, Xu, Xiao, Yin & Peng, 2019 — China
Otacilia ambon Deeleman-Reinhold, 2001 — Indonesia (Moluccas)
Otacilia annula (Zhou, Wang & Zhang, 2013) — China
Otacilia antica (Wang, Chen, Zhou, Zhang & Zhang, 2015) — China
Otacilia arcuata Mu & Zhang, 2021 — China
Otacilia armatissima Thorell, 1897 — Myanmar
Otacilia aurita Fu, Zhang & Zhang, 2016 — China
Otacilia bawangling Fu, Zhang & Zhu, 2010 — China
Otacilia biarclata Fu, He & Zhang, 2015 — China
Otacilia bicolor Jäger & Wunderlich, 2012 — Laos
Otacilia bifida (Yin, Ubick, Bao & Xu, 2004) — China
Otacilia bifurcata Dankittipakul & Singtripop, 2014 — Thailand
Otacilia bijiashanica Liu, 2020 — China
Otacilia bizhouica Liu, 2020 — China
Otacilia cangshan (Yang, Fu, Zhang & Zhang, 2010) — China
Otacilia celata (Fu, Chen & Zhang, 2016) — China
Otacilia christae Jäger & Wunderlich, 2012 — Laos
Otacilia clavata (Yao, Irfan & Peng, 2019) — China
Otacilia coreana (Paik, 1991) — Korea, Russia (Kurile Is.), Japan
Otacilia curvata Jin, Fu, Yin & Zhang, 2016 — China
Otacilia dadongshanica Liu, 2021 — China
Otacilia daweishan Liu, Xu, Xiao, Yin & Peng, 2019 — China
Otacilia daxiang Du, Pu & Yang, 2013 — China
Otacilia dentigera Mu & Zhang, 2021 — China
Otacilia dianchiensis (Yin, Peng, Gong & Kim, 1997) — China
Otacilia digitata Fu, Zhang & Zhang, 2016 — China
Otacilia ensifera Mu & Zhang, 2021 — China
Otacilia fabiformis Liu, Xu, Xiao, Yin & Peng, 2019 — China
Otacilia fanjingshan (Wang, Chen, Zhou, Zhang & Zhang, 2015) — China
Otacilia fansipan Jäger & Dimitrov, 2019 — Vietnam
Otacilia fausta (Paik, 1991) — Korea
Otacilia flexa Fu, Zhang & Zhang, 2016 — China
Otacilia florifera Fu, He & Zhang, 2015 — China
Otacilia forcipata Yang, Wang & Yang, 2013 — China
Otacilia foveata (Song, 1990) — China
Otacilia fujiana Fu, Jin & Zhang, 2014 — China
Otacilia gougunao Liu, 2020 — China
Otacilia hamata (Wang, Zhang & Zhang, 2012) — China
Otacilia hengshan (Song, 1990) — China
Otacilia hippocampa Jin, Fu, Yin & Zhang, 2016 — China
Otacilia involuta (Yao, Irfan & Peng, 2019) — China
Otacilia jiandao Liu, Xu, Xiao, Yin & Peng, 2019 — China
Otacilia jianfengling Fu, Zhang & Zhu, 2010 — China
Otacilia kamurai Ono & Ogata, 2018 — Japan
Otacilia kao Jäger & Wunderlich, 2012 — Thailand, Vietnam
Otacilia komurai (Yaginuma, 1952) — China, Korea, Japan
Otacilia lata Yao, Irfan & Peng, 2019 — China
Otacilia leibo Fu, Zhang & Zhang, 2016 — China
Otacilia limushan Fu, Zhang & Zhu, 2010 — China
Otacilia liupan Hu & Zhang, 2011 — China
Otacilia longa (Fu, Chen & Zhang, 2016) — China
Otacilia longituba Wang, Zhang & Zhang, 2012 — China
Otacilia longtanica Liu, 2020 — China
Otacilia loriot Jäger & Wunderlich, 2012 — Laos
Otacilia lubrica Mu & Zhang, 2021 — China
Otacilia luna (Kamura, 1994) — Japan
Otacilia luzonica (Simon, 1898) — Philippines
Otacilia lynx (Kamura, 1994) — Taiwan, Japan
Otacilia macrospora Fu, Z. S. Zhang & F. Zhang, 2016 — China
Otacilia meles Kamura, 2021 — Japan
Otacilia microstoma Wang, Chen, Zhou, Zhang & Zhang, 2015 — China
Otacilia mingsheng Yang, Wang & Yang, 2013 — China
Otacilia mira Fu, Zhang & Zhang, 2016 — China
Otacilia mustela Kamura, 2008 — Japan
Otacilia namkhan Jäger & Wunderlich, 2012 — Laos
Otacilia nanhuashanica Liu, 2020 — China
Otacilia nigerus (Yin, 2012) — China
Otacilia nonggang Liu, Xu, Xiao, Yin & Peng, 2019 — China
Otacilia obesa Fu, Z. S. Zhang & F. Zhang, 2016 — China
Otacilia onoi Deeleman-Reinhold, 2001 — Thailand
Otacilia ovata Fu, Zhang & Zhang, 2016 — China
Otacilia ovoidea Liu, 2020 — China
Otacilia palgongensis (Seo, 1988) — Russia (Far East), China, Korea
Otacilia palmata Yao, Irfan & Peng, 2019 — China
Otacilia papilion Fu, Zhang & Zhang, 2016 — China
Otacilia papilla Dankittipakul & Singtripop, 2014 — Indonesia (Sumatra)
Otacilia paracymbium Jäger & Wunderlich, 2012 — China
Otacilia parva Deeleman-Reinhold, 2001 — Indonesia (Sumatra)
Otacilia pennata (Yaginuma, 1967) — Russia (South Siberia, Far East), China, Korea, Japan
Otacilia pseudostella Fu, Jin & Zhang, 2014 — China
Otacilia pyriformis Fu, Zhang & Zhang, 2016 — China
Otacilia qiqiensis (Yin, Ubick, Bao & Xu, 2004) — China
Otacilia revoluta (Yin, Ubick, Bao & Xu, 2004) — China
Otacilia rulinensis Yao, Irfan & Peng, 2019 — China
Otacilia shanxi Mu & Zhang, 2021 — China
Otacilia shenshanica Liu, 2020 — China
Otacilia simianshan Zhou, Wang & Zhang, 2013 — China
Otacilia sinifera Deeleman-Reinhold, 2001 — Thailand
Otacilia songi Wang, Chen, Zhou, Zhang & Zhang, 2015 — China
Otacilia spiralis Mu & Zhang, 2021 — China
Otacilia splendida (Song & Zheng, 1992) — China, Japan
Otacilia squamaca (Yao, Irfan & Peng, 2019) — China
Otacilia stella Kamura, 2005 — Japan
Otacilia subannula (Fu, Chen & Zhang, 2016) — China
Otacilia subfabiformis Liu, 2020 — China
Otacilia subliupan Wang, Chen, Zhou, Zhang & Zhang, 2015 — China
Otacilia submicrostoma Jin, Fu, Yin & Zhang, 2016 — China
Otacilia subnigerus (Fu, Chen & Zhang, 2016) — China
Otacilia subovoidea Liu, 2020 — China
Otacilia taiwanica (Hayashi & Yoshida, 1993) — China, Taiwan, Japan
Otacilia taoyuan (Fu, Chen & Zhang, 2016) — China
Otacilia truncata Dankittipakul & Singtripop, 2014 — Thailand
Otacilia valida (Fu, Chen & Zhang, 2016) — China
Otacilia vangvieng Jäger & Wunderlich, 2012 — Laos
Otacilia vulpes (Kamura, 2001) — Japan
Otacilia wanshou (Yin, 2012) — China
Otacilia wugongshanica Liu, 2020 — China
Otacilia wuli Mu & Zhang, 2021 — China
Otacilia xiaoxiica Liu, 2020 — China
Otacilia xingdoushanensis Yao, Irfan & Peng, 2019 — China
Otacilia yangi Zhang, Fu & Zhu, 2009 — China
Otacilia yangmingensis Jin, Fu, Yin & Zhang, 2016 — China
Otacilia yinae Liu, Xu, Xiao, Yin & Peng, 2019 — China
Otacilia yusishanica Liu, 2020 — China
Otacilia zaoshiica Liu, 2020 — China
Otacilia zebra Deeleman-Reinhold, 2001 — Thailand
Otacilia zhangi Fu, Jin & Zhang, 2014 — China
Otacilia zhouyun (Wang, Chen, Zhou, Zhang & Zhang, 2015) — China
Otacilia ziyaoshanica Liu, 2020 — China
Otacilia zongxu (Wang, Zhang & Zhang, 2012) — China

References

External links

Araneomorphae genera
Phrurolithidae